Mirza Waheed is a novelist who was born and raised in Srinagar but now lives in London.

Writing career

Mirza has written for the BBC, The Guardian, Granta, Guernica (magazine), Al Jazeera English and The New York Times.

His first novel, The Collaborator, was published in 2011 and was a finalist for the Guardian First Book award. It takes place in his homeland of Kashmir, torn in conflict between India and Pakistan. Novelist Kamila Shamsie reviewed it for The Guardian and called it "gripping in its narrative drama...Waheed gives us a portrait of Kashmir itself. Away from the rhetorical posturing of India and Pakistan, he reveals, with great sensitivity and an anger that arises from compassion, what it is to live in a part of the world that is regarded by the national government as the enemy within, and by the government next door as a strategic puppet."

Waheed's second novel, The Book of Gold Leaves, was published in 2014.  A love story between a Sunni and a Shi'ite in troubled 1990s Kashmir, it was reviewed by Alice Albinia in the Financial Times: "A haunting illustration of how, at the end of last century, normal life became impossible for many of those who call Kashmir home."

His third novel,  Tell Her Everything, was released in January 2019.  It is the story of a father who is preparing to reveal his own unsavory past to the now-grown daughter that he sent away to boarding school as a small child.

Personal life

Waheed and his wife have a son and a daughter and he has said that he limits his book-promotion travels in order to stay home in London and care for them. He worked for the BBC for ten years, but quit in 2011 to devote himself full-time to writing and raising his children.

He plays cricket for the Authors XI team, which is composed of British writers.

Awards and honours
2011 "Books of the Year" for The Collaborator in The Telegraph, New Statesman, Business Standard and Telegraph India.
2011 Guardian First Book Award finalist for The Collaborator
2011 Shakti Bhatt First Book Prize finalist for The Collaborator
2012 Desmond Elliott Prize longlist for The Collaborator
2016 DSC Prize for South Asian Literature shortlist for The Book of Gold Leaves
2019 The Hindu Literary Prize for Tell Her Everything

Books 
 The Collaborator (2012), 
 The Book of Gold Leaves (2014), 
 Tell Her Everything (2019),

References

Year of birth missing (living people)
Living people
Kashmiri people
Indian Muslims
Kashmiri Muslims
People from Srinagar
British journalists
Journalists from Jammu and Kashmir
21st-century Indian novelists
21st-century British novelists
British people of Indian descent
British people of Kashmiri descent
British Muslims
Delhi University alumni
Kashmiri writers]
Novelists from Jammu and Kashmir